Sir Derek Harold Richard Barton  (8 September 1918 – 16 March 1998) was an English organic chemist and Nobel Prize laureate for 1969.

Education and early life
Barton was born in Gravesend, Kent, to William Thomas and Maude Henrietta Barton (née Lukes).

He attended Gravesend Grammar School (1926–29), The King's School, Rochester (1929–32), Tonbridge School (1932–35) and Medway Technical College (1937–39). In 1938 he entered Imperial College London, where he graduated in 1940 and obtained his PhD degree in Organic Chemistry in 1942.

Career and research
From 1942 to 1944 Barton was a government research chemist, then from 1944 to 1945 he worked for Albright and Wilson in Birmingham. He then became Assistant Lecturer in the Department of Chemistry of Imperial College, and from 1946 to 1949 he was ICI Research Fellow.

During 1949 and 1950 he was visiting lecturer in natural products chemistry at Harvard University, and was then appointed reader in organic chemistry and, in 1953, professor at Birkbeck College. In 1955 he became Regius Professor of Chemistry at the University of Glasgow, in 1957 he was appointed professor of organic chemistry at Imperial College. In 1950, Barton showed that organic molecules could be assigned a preferred conformation based upon results accumulated by chemical physicists, in particular by Odd Hassel. Using this new technique of conformational analysis, he later determined the geometry of many other natural product molecules.

In 1969, Barton shared the Nobel Prize in Chemistry with Odd Hassel for “contributions to the development of the concept of conformation and its application in chemistry."

In 1958 Barton was appointed Arthur D. Little Visiting Professor of Massachusetts Institute of Technology, and in 1959 Karl Folkers Visiting Professor of at the Universities of Illinois and Wisconsin. The same year he was elected a foreign honorary member of the American Academy of Arts and Sciences.

In 1949 he was the first recipient of the Corday-Morgan Medal and Prize awarded by the Royal Society of Chemistry. In 1954 he was elected a Fellow of the Royal Society and the International Academy of Science, Munich as well as, in 1956, a Fellow of the Royal Society of Edinburgh; in 1965 he was appointed member of the Council for Scientific Policy. He was knighted in 1972, becoming formally styled Sir Derek in Britain. In 1978 he became Director of the Institut de Chimie des Substances Naturelles (ICSN - Gif Sur-Yvette) in France.

In 1977, on the occasion of the centenary of the Royal Institute of Chemistry, the British Post Office honoured him, and 5 other Nobel Prize-winning British chemists, with a series of four postage stamps featuring aspects of their discoveries.

He moved to the United States in 1986 (specifically Texas) and became distinguished professor at Texas A&M University and held this position for 12 years until his death.

In 1996, Barton published a comprehensive volume of his works, entitled Reason and Imagination: Reflections on Research in Organic Chemistry.

As well as for his work on conformation, his name is remembered in a number of reactions in organic chemistry such as the Barton reaction, the Barton decarboxylation, and the Barton-McCombie deoxygenation.

The newly built Barton Science Centre at Tonbridge School in Kent, where he was educated for 4 years, completed in 2019, is named after him.

Honours and awards
Barton was elected a Fellow of the Royal Society (FRS) in 1954.
In 1966 he was elected a Member of the German Academy of Sciences Leopoldina. He was elected to the United States National Academy of Sciences in 1970 and the American Philosophical Society in 1978.
  - Knight Bachelor (1972)
  - Légion d'honneur (1972)

Personal life
Sir Derek married three times: Jeanne Kate Wilkins (on 20 December 1944); Christiane Cognet (in 1969); and Judith Von-Leuenberger Cobb (in 1993). He had a son by his first marriage.

References

External links 
  including the Nobel Lecture, 11 December 1969 The Principles of Conformational Analysis

1918 births
1998 deaths
People from Gravesend, Kent
People educated at Gravesend Grammar School
People educated at Tonbridge School
People educated at King's School, Rochester
Alumni of Imperial College London
Academics of Birkbeck, University of London
Academics of Imperial College London
Harvard University staff
Organic chemists
British physical chemists
Fellows of the Royal Society
Foreign associates of the National Academy of Sciences
Knights Bachelor
Chevaliers of the Légion d'honneur
Nobel laureates in Chemistry
Fellows of the Royal Society of Edinburgh
Foreign members of the Chinese Academy of Sciences
Texas A&M University faculty
Recipients of the Copley Medal
Royal Medal winners
Fellows of the American Academy of Arts and Sciences
Members of the Slovenian Academy of Sciences and Arts
Members of the Serbian Academy of Sciences and Arts
English Nobel laureates
Members of the German Academy of Sciences Leopoldina
Regius Professors
Members of the American Philosophical Society